The Houstons: On Our Own is an American reality documentary television series that premiered on October 24, 2012, on Lifetime. The series was announced on May 11, 2012, with the working title of The Houston Family Chronicles and was to have ten episodes. The Houstons: On Our Own chronicles the lives of Whitney Houston's family as they move on from her death. It ran for 14 episodes.

Cast
 Bobbi Kristina Brown: Whitney and Bobby Brown's daughter
 Cissy Houston: Whitney's mother
 Gary Houston: Whitney's older brother
 Rayah Houston: Pat and Gary's daughter
 Pat Houston: Whitney's sister-in-law, manager, and Krissy's guardian
 Nick Gordon: Bobbi Kristina's friend

Episodes

Critical reception
The show was met with mixed or average reviews with a score of 43 out of 100 on Metacritic based on 7 reviews. The New York Daily News said that the show does not have any kind of effect the viewers might want, at least at first. The Los Angeles Times said the show is intrusive and also uncomfortable.

References

External links
 
 The Houstons: On Our Own on TV.com

Whitney Houston
2010s American reality television series
2012 American television series debuts
2013 American television series endings
English-language television shows
Lifetime (TV network) original programming
Television shows set in Georgia (U.S. state)